The following outline is provided as an overview of and topical guide to Metro Manila:

Metro Manila is the capital region of the Philippines, and is one of its seventeen administrative regions. It is located on the eastern shore of Manila Bay, in the southern portion of the island of Luzon. It lies between the Central Luzon and Calabarzon regions, with the province of Bulacan to the north, Rizal to the east, and Laguna and Cavite to the south.

Metro Manila comprises 16 cities and municipalities, including the capital city, Manila. Although Metro Manila was formed only in 1975, Manila itself dates back to 1571, with the establishment of the Province of Manila during the Spanish colonial period. The earliest evidence of human life in and around the area of Manila was dated to around 3000 BC.

General reference
 Pronunciation: 
 Common English name(s): Metro Manila, Manila (informal)
 Local name(s): Kalakhang Maynila, Maynila, Kamaynilaan
 Official English name: National Capital Region of the Republic of the Philippines
 Official local name: Pambansang Punong Rehiyon ng Republika ng Pilipinas
 Nickname(s): See: Nicknames of Manila
 Adjectival(s): Manilan, Manileño
 Demonym(s): Manileños, Manileñas, Manilans
 Abbreviation(s) and code(s):
 Common abbreviations: NCR, M.M., MNL
 Vehicle registration code: NCR (2014 series)
 ISO 3166-2 code: PH–00
 ZIP code: 1000–1800
 : 2

Geography

 Metro Manila is a:
 capital region
 metropolitan area
 administrative region of the Philippines.
 isthmus in southern Luzon between Manila Bay, an arm of the South China Sea, and Laguna de Bay.

Location

 Metro Manila is situated in the following regions.
 Northern Hemisphere, Eastern Hemisphere
 Asia
 Southeast Asia
 Maritime Southeast Asia
 Philippines
 Luzon
 Greater Manila Area
 Time zone: Philippine Standard Time (UTC+08)
 Population of Metro Manila:  (2015 Census)
 Area of Metro Manila: 613.5 km2
 Atlas of Metro Manila
 Climate of Metro Manila: tropical savanna and tropical monsoon

Geographic features

 Manila Bay
 Pasig River (Rivers of Metro Manila)
 Marikina River
 Laguna de Bay
 Sierra Madre
 Islands in the Greater Manila Area
 Marikina Valley Fault System
 Beaches in the Greater Manila Area

Places

 Parks in Metro Manila
 National parks
 Rizal Park
 Quezon Memorial Circle
 Nature reserves
 La Mesa Watershed Reservation
 Nature parks
 Arroceros Forest Park
 Balara Filters Park
 Freedom Island
 University of the Philippines Arboretum
 Squares and plazas
 Plaza de Armas (Manila)
 Liwasang Bonifacio (Plaza Bonifacio)
 Plaza Dilao
 Plaza de España (Manila)
 Plaza de Mexico (Manila)
 Plaza Miranda
 Plaza Moraga
 Plaza Moriones
 Plaza Rajah Sulayman
 Plaza de Roma
 Plaza San Lorenzo Ruiz
 Zoos and aquaria
 Ark Avilon Zoo
 Manila Ocean Park
 Manila Zoo
 Ninoy Aquino Parks & Wildlife Center
 Pasig Rainforest Park
 Heritage sites
 World Heritage Sites in Metro Manila
 San Agustin Church (Baroque Churches of the Philippines)
 Cultural Properties of the Philippines in Metro Manila
 Historical markers in Metro Manila

Administrative divisions

Administrative divisions of Metro Manila

 Cities of Metro Manila
 Manila
 Caloocan
 Las Piñas
 Makati
 Malabon
 Mandaluyong
 Marikina
 Muntinlupa
 Navotas
 Parañaque
 Pasay
 Pasig
 Quezon City
 San Juan
 Taguig
 Valenzuela
 Municipality of Metro Manila
 Pateros
 Barangays of Metro Manila
 Districts of Manila
 Binondo, Ermita, Intramuros, Malate, Paco, Pandacan, Port Area, Quiapo, San Andres, San Miguel, San Nicolas, Santa Ana, Santa Cruz, Santa Mesa, Tondo

Economy and infrastructure
 Philippine Stock Exchange
 Manila Commodity Exchange
 Makati Business Club
 Central business districts
 Makati Central Business District
 Ortigas Center
 Bonifacio Global City
 Mixed-use developments
 Araneta Center
 Arca South
 Ayala Center
 Bay City, Metro Manila
 Capitol Commons
 Century City, Makati
 Circuit Makati
 Eastwood City
 Entertainment City
 Eton Centris
 New Manila Bay–City of Pearl
 Newport City, Metro Manila
 Riverbanks Center
 Robinsons Cybergate
 Rockwell Center
 San Lazaro Tourism and Business Park
 Triangle Park
 U.P.-Ayala Land TechnoHub
 Skyscrapers (Tallest buildings in Metro Manila)
 Land reclamation in Metro Manila
 Poverty
 Slums in Metro Manila
 Bagong Silangan
 Payatas
 San Andres
 Smokey Mountain
 Tondo

Communication
 Newspapers published in Metro Manila
 Television stations in Metro Manila
 Radio stations in Metro Manila

Tourism

Tourism in Metro Manila
 Hotels in Metro Manila
 Casinos
 City of Dreams Manila
 Okada Manila
 Resorts World Manila
 Solaire Resort & Casino
 Gambling in Metro Manila
 Theme parks
 KidZania Manila
 Star City (amusement park)

Transportation

 Road
 Roads in Metro Manila
 Bridges and crossings of the Pasig River
 Bridges and crossings of the Marikina River
 Unified Vehicular Volume Reduction Program
 Rail
 Light Rail Transit Authority
 Metro Rail Transit Corporation
 Philippine National Railways
 Manila Light Rail Transit System
 Line 1
 Line 2
 Line 4
 Line 6
 Manila Metro Rail Transit System
 Line 3
 Line 5
 Line 7
 Line 8
 Line 9
 PNR Metro Commuter Line
 Strong Republic Transit System
 Rail transit stations in the Greater Manila Area
 Bicutan Automated Guideway Transit System
 University of the Philippines Diliman Automated Guideway Transit System
 Aviation
 Manila International Airport Authority
 Clark International Airport Corporation
 Airports in the Greater Manila Area
 Ninoy Aquino International Airport
 Clark International Airport
 Subic Bay International Airport
 Water
 Port of Manila
 North Port Passenger Terminal
 Pasig River Ferry Service

Education
 Universities and colleges in Metro Manila
 Primary and secondary schools in Metro Manila
 International schools in Metro Manila
 Libraries in Metro Manila
 University Belt
 Military schools
 Armed Forces of the Philippines Command and General Staff College
 National Defense College of the Philippines
 Seminaries and theological colleges
 Alliance Graduate School
 Asian Seminary of Christian Ministries
 Christ the King Mission Seminary
 Maryhill School of Theology
 San Carlos Seminary
 South East Asia Graduate School of Theology

Government and politics
 Metropolitan Manila Development Authority
 Chairman: Romando S. Artes
 Metro Manila Council
 Mayors of Metro Manila
 Legislative districts
 Caloocan 1st, 2nd and 3rd districts
 Las Piñas district
 Makati 1st and 2nd districts
 Malabon district
 Mandaluyong district
 Manila 1st, 2nd, 3rd, 4th, 5th and 6th districts
 Marikina 1st and 2nd districts
 Muntinlupa district
 Navotas district
 Parañaque 1st and 2nd districts
 Pasay district
 Pasig district
 Pateros-Taguig district
 Quezon City 1st, 2nd, 3rd, 4th, 5th and 6th districts
 San Juan district
 Taguig district
 Valenzuela 1st and 2nd districts
 Public services
 National Capital Region Police Office
 Eastern Police District
 Manila Police District
 Northern Police District
 Quezon City Police District
 Southern Police District
 Bureau of Fire Protection National Capital Region
 Manila Fire District
 Fire District II
 Fire District III
 Fire District IV
 Quezon City Fire District
 Bureau of Jail Management and Penology Regional Office - National Capital Region
 New Bilibid Prison
 Pasig River Rehabilitation Commission
 Laguna Lake Development Authority
 Military in Metro Manila
 National Capital Regional Command (Philippines)
 AFP Joint Task Force-National Capital Region
 Camp Aguinaldo
 Fort Bonifacio
 Camp Crame
 Camp Atienza
 Villamor Air Base
 Utilities
 Metropolitan Waterworks and Sewerage System
 Manila Water
 Maynilad Water Services
 Water privatization in Metro Manila
 Meralco
 Elections
 2019 Philippine House of Representatives elections
 2019 Philippine local elections
 International relations
 List of sister cities in Metro Manila

Health
 Hospitals in Metro Manila
 Gota de Leche
 Lung Center of the Philippines
 National Center for Mental Health
 National Kidney and Transplant Institute
 Philippine General Hospital
 Philippine Heart Center
 Research Institute for Tropical Medicine
 Orphanages
 Asilo de San Vicente de Paul
 Hospicio de San Jose
 White Cross Orphanage

History

 Prehistory of Manila
 Pre-Spanish era
 Kingdom of Tondo
 Kingdom of Namayan
 Kingdom of Maynila
 Battle of Manila (1570)
 Spanish colonial period
 Manila (province)
 Real Audiencia of Manila
 Manila galleon
 Battle of Bangkusay Channel
 Battle of Manila (1574)
 Conspiracy of the Maharlikas
 Sangley Rebellion
 1645 Luzon earthquake
 Battles of La Naval de Manila
 Battle of Manila (1762)
 British occupation of Manila
 Raid on Manila (1798)
 1880 Luzon earthquakes
 Philippine Revolution
 Cry of Pugad Lawin
 Battle of Pasong Tamo
 Battle of Manila (1896)
 Battle of San Juan del Monte
 Battle of San Mateo and Montalban
 1896 Manila mutiny
 Battle of Pateros
 Battle of Zapote Bridge (1897)
 Retreat to Montalban
 Spanish–American War
 Battle of Manila Bay
 Battle of Manila (1898)
 American colonial period
 Province of Rizal
 Manila Army and Navy Club
 Fort William McKinley
 Philippine–American War
 Battle of Caloocan
 Second Battle of Caloocan
 Battle of Zapote River
 Battle of Paye
 Far Eastern Championship Games
 Harbor Defenses of Manila and Subic Bays
 World War II
 Post of Manila
 City of Greater Manila
 Santo Tomas Internment Camp
 Battle of Manila (1945)
 Manila massacre
 Treaty of Manila (1946)
 1946–1986
 Treaty of Manila (1954)
 Manila Accord
 Philippine Constabulary Metropolitan Command
 1968 Casiguran earthquake
 Typhoon Patsy (1970)
 Plaza Miranda bombing
 Metropolitan Manila Commission
 City of Man
 Thrilla in Manila
 Assassination of Benigno Aquino, Jr.
 People Power Revolution
 1986–Present
 Mendiola massacre
 Metropolitan Manila Authority
 1990 Luzon earthquake
 World Youth Day 1995
 Metropolitan Manila Development Authority
 Ozone Disco Club fire
 Pasig River Rehabilitation Commission
 Rizal Day bombings
 Second EDSA Revolution
 May 1 riots
 Oakwood mutiny
 Manila Peninsula siege
 PhilSports Stadium stampede
 2007 Glorietta explosion
 Batasang Pambansa bombing
 Typhoon Ketsana
 Manila hostage crisis
 2010 Philippine Bar exam bombing
 2012 Metro Manila flooding
 Million People March
 Pope Francis's visit to the Philippines
 Resorts World Manila attack
 2020 Taal Volcano eruption
 COVID-19 pandemic in Metro Manila
 Typhoon Vamco (Ulysses)

Culture
 Cultural Center of the Philippines Complex
 Annual events in Metro Manila
 Sporting events in Metro Manila
 Cinemas in Metro Manila
 Cultural Properties of the Philippines in Metro Manila
 Museums in Metro Manila
 Public art in Metro Manila
 Songs about Manila
 Shopping malls in Metro Manila
 Sports venues in Metro Manila
 Theaters and concert halls in Metro Manila
 Art Deco theaters in Metro Manila

Religion
 Religious buildings in Metro Manila
 Buddhist temples
 IBPS Manila
 Ocean Sky Chan Monastery
 Seng Guan Temple
 Churches
 Roman Catholic churches in Metro Manila
 Mosques
 Masjid Al-Dahab
 Baclaran Mosque
 Roman Catholic Church
 Roman Catholic Archdiocese of Manila
 Roman Catholic Diocese of Antipolo
 Roman Catholic Diocese of Cubao
 Roman Catholic Diocese of Imus
 Roman Catholic Diocese of Kalookan
 Roman Catholic Diocese of Malolos
 Roman Catholic Diocese of Novaliches
 Roman Catholic Diocese of Parañaque
 Roman Catholic Diocese of Pasig
 Roman Catholic Diocese of San Pablo
 Military Ordinariate of the Philippines
 Cemeteries in Metro Manila

See also
 Index of Metro Manila–related articles
 Outline of the Philippines

References

External links

 Metropolitan Manila Development Authority
 It's More Fun in the Philippines - National Capital Region by the Department of Tourism (Philippines)

Metro Manila
.
.